Organic beef is beef grown according to organic food principles.

Organic beef
According to the USDA National Organic Program (NOP) Standards rules passed on October 22, 2002, certified organic livestock, including beef, must come from a fully verifiable production system that collects information on the history of every animal in the program, including its breed history, veterinary care, and feed. Further, to be certified as organic, all cattle should meet the following criteria:
"Produced without genetic engineering, use of ionizing radiation or sewage sludge" 
Allowed continuous access to the outdoors except in specific conditions such as inclement weather
Fed feed and raised on land that meets all organic crop production standards
Never receive antibiotics
Never receive growth hormones
Never receive prohibited substances such as urea, manure, or arsenic-containing compounds
Managed organically from last third of gestation onward

Organic vs. Natural
With the arrival of the organic label, many assumed that the terms “organic” and “natural” were interchangeable, failing to understand the strict regulations required to raise certified organic beef. The USDA defines “natural” beef as minimally-processed beef without additives. Natural beef producers may choose not to use antibiotics or growth-promoting hormones, but there is no third-party verification system required by the USDA. Beef from feedlots can be labeled natural, according to the USDA’s definition.

The U.S. Department of Agriculture allows any fresh meat to be described as "natural" if it includes no artificial flavoring, coloring, preservative or any other artificial ingredient.  Minimally processed products, such as ground meat, also count as "natural."  To be marketed as "natural," the product can not contain any additives, such as monosodium glutamate or salt.

Grass-fed vs Grain-fed beef
As organic cattle approach market weight, there are two feeding methods that producers most commonly use to deliver beef products to their customers: “grass-fed” and “grain-fed”. In the “grass-fed” program, the cattle continue to eat certified organic grass right up to the time of slaughter. The USDA is currently developing guidelines to define the term “grass-fed”, and it is expected to call for an all-grass diet of at least 95%. Strictly grass-fed cattle tend to be leaner than grain-fed. Grain-feeding produces cattle with a higher percentage of fat. All grains must be certified organic to ensure the integrity of the program.

References

External links
USDA
National Organic Program

Beef